Yahoo! Labs served as Yahoo!'s research arm, aiming to develop research in technologies to be used within the company. Yahoo! Labs includes approximately 200 research scientists and engineers.

Yahoo! Labs is headquartered in Sunnyvale, CA; it has three additional locations worldwide: New York, London - England; and Haifa - Israel. Yahoo Labs Barcelona was closed in early 2015.

On February 17, 2016, Yahoo! announced that Yahoo! Labs was being replaced with Yahoo! Research.

History 

In July 2005, Usama Fayyad (Yahoo!’s Chief Data Officer), Prabhakar Raghavan,  Andrew Tomkins, Kevin Lang, and other employees who were working for the former "Yahoo! Research Labs" organization formed the new research team. Raghavan was named as Head of Yahoo! Research. Ronald J. Brachman, having finished a term as office director at DARPA, joined as the head of worldwide research operations in early September. The team was soon joined by Andrei Broder and Ricardo Baeza-Yates.

Yahoo! Labs was formed in 2008 through a proposal by Ronald Brachman and Larry Heck from the Yahoo! Search and Advertising Sciences Lab. The proposal combined the two labs into a single organization. In 2012, Ron Brachman took over as Head of Yahoo! Labs and also became Yahoo's chief scientist.

Groups unrelated to research 

Yahoo! Labs includes two groups unrelated to research:

Academic Partnerships 

Academic Partnerships at Yahoo! Labs builds relationships with select academic research institutions and fosters collaborative research by sharing datasets for research, hosting academic visits and talks, and funding project grants and merit-based awards. Additionally, the team aids Yahoo! with graduate student sourcing and helps inform the company on strategic opportunities and insights from the external research community.

Operations 

Operations at Yahoo! Labs is responsible for managing the day-to-day processes and procedures. The Operations team leads Yahoo! corporate initiatives on behalf of the Labs and tracks progress for Labs' goals. Furthermore, the Operations team is responsible for managing Yahoo! Labs' finances, recruiting efforts, events, and communications.

Notable accomplishments 

 Best Paper award winners at KDD, UIST, SocInfo, and CIKM in 2013; SPAA, Hypertext, UbiComp, MobileHCI, and RecSys in 2014; ECIR, ICWSM, and ICML in 2015
 96 patents issued to Yahoo! Labs inventors in 2013 and 2014, and 50+ in 2015
 Association for Computing Machinery (ACM), IEEE, AAAI, and Association for Computational Linguistics (ACL) fellows and distinguished members; past president of AAAI
 General and PC chairs at leading conferences
 Past and current editors, associate editors, and editors-in-chief of leading scientific journals
 Authors and editors of academic and popular press books
 Member of the board of directors and treasurer of the Computing Research Association (CRA)

References

External links 
 

Labs
Computer science research organizations
Science and technology in the San Francisco Bay Area